Fujiwara no Taishi (藤原 泰子, also read Fujiwara no Yasuko; 1095–1156) was an Empress consort of Japan. She was the consort of Emperor Toba of Japan. Her birth name was Fujiwara no Kunshi (藤原 勲子), her ingō was Kaya-no-in (高陽院) and her dharma name upon entering religious orders in 1141 was Shōjōri (清浄理).

Notes

External links
 http://www.guide2womenleaders.com/japan_heads.htm

Fujiwara clan
Japanese empresses
Japanese Buddhist nuns
12th-century Buddhist nuns
1095 births
1156 deaths